Albert Knutti (8 May 1912 – 19 March 1997) was a Swiss racing cyclist. He rode in the 1938 Tour de France.

References

1912 births
1997 deaths
Swiss male cyclists
Place of birth missing